Janne Juhani Ojanen (born April 9, 1968) is a Finnish former professional ice hockey player who is the all-time leading scorer in Finland's SM-liiga with 799 points. He spent the majority of his career playing for SM-liiga team Tappara.

Playing career

Early Career in Finland
Ojanen started his playing career playing for his hometown team Tappara. Ojanen played 3 SM-liiga games on his first season. Two years earlier Ojanen was selected as the best player in Pohjola Leiri, an annual youth training camp where the best under-18 players play and are selected to Youth National Team. Ojanen was drafted to NHL the following year by New Jersey Devils. Ojanen played his first adult international tournaments in 1987 as he was selected to Finland's Canada Cup and World Championship teams. Ojanen was part of the 1988 Olympic Team which won Finland's first International tournament medal. Ojanen won the SM-liiga Championship twice in 1987 and 1988 during his early years in Tappara.

First Attempt in NHL
In 1988, Ojanen was acquired by New Jersey Devils, the team which had drafted Ojanen in 1986. Ojanen's debut season consisted of three games in the NHL and 72 in Devils affiliate team Utica Devils.

During the following season, Ojanen had more games for the Devils and stayed on the roster for the entire season, scoring 30 points in 64 games. After his first full season in Devils, he decided to return to Finland

Brief return to Finland
After his two years in North America, Ojanen returned to Finland played two seasons for Tappara. Ojanen also played in the 1991 Canada Cup. During 1991–92 Season Ojanen returned to New Jersey.

Second NHL Visit
Ojanen made his NHL return in 1991–92 NHL playoffs and played three games for the Devils. Ojanen's fourth NHL season however was not that good. He played 31 games for Devils during the 1992–93 NHL season and seven games for Cincinnati Cyclones, scoring 9 points for Cyclones. After the end of the season Ojanen again went back to Finland.

Return to Finland
Ojanen returned to Tappara for the 1993–94 SM-liiga season and was in good shape as he was one of the leading players for Tappara. He also had some international glory during his first season back in Europe. Ojanen played in the 1994 Winter Olympics and 1994 World Championships, winning Olympic bronze and World Championships silver.

The colour of his World Championship medal improved as Ojanen was part of the first world championship winning team of Finland, when they beat rival Sweden 4 goals to 1 in the finals and the tournament was played in Sweden. During the 1994–95 season Ojanen played also for Swiss HC Lugano in Nationalliga A playoffs, as Tappara's SM-liga season had ended.

Ojanen played the following season for Tappara and was selected to World Cup and World Championship squads.

Visit to Sweden and final return to Finland
After three seasons in Tappara, Ojanen was signed by the Swedish Elitserien Malmö IF Redhawks. Ojanen had signed a two-year contract to Malmö and played well in Sweden. During his first season, he was selected to 1997 World Championship team.

After his two-year stay in Sweden, Ojanen made his return to Tappara. Although he was already 30 years old, he still was one of the top Finnish players in SM-liiga and had a big role in Tappara. Ojanen had a consistent form during his seasons and was selected to World Championships for the last time in 2002.

Late career
Ojanen won his final SM-liiga Championship in 2003 when Tappara won Kärpät in the Finals. Ojanen had acquired the captaincy of Tappara in 2000 and his time as captain has lasted for 8 years. He has announced that he will continue to play one more season 2008–2009. During his time in Tappara, Ojanen has been viewed as the premier player for Tappara like Erik Hämäläinen is for Lukko and Raimo Helminen is for Ilves. Ojanen's has played his entire SM-liiga career in Tappara.

On November 28, 2009 Ojanen became top scorer all-time in SM-liiga, surpassing Arto Javanainen who had held a record for 16 years.

International career
Ojanen played 205 games for Finland, with 50 goals and 74 assists. He played six World Championship tournaments, twice in Canada Cup, once in World Cup and played three times in the Winter Olympics. For several years, Ojanen was the only Finnish player to have won both a World Junior Championship and a Men's World Championships gold medal. In 2011, he was joined by Niko Kapanen and Pasi Puistola.

Awards, honors and records

Career statistics

Regular season and playoffs

International

External links 
 
 

1968 births
Living people
Cincinnati Cyclones (IHL) players
Finnish ice hockey centres
HC Lugano players
Ice hockey players at the 1988 Winter Olympics
Ice hockey players at the 1994 Winter Olympics
Ice hockey players with retired numbers
Malmö Redhawks players
Medalists at the 1988 Winter Olympics
Medalists at the 1994 Winter Olympics
New Jersey Devils draft picks
New Jersey Devils players
Olympic bronze medalists for Finland
Olympic ice hockey players of Finland
Olympic medalists in ice hockey
Olympic silver medalists for Finland
Ice hockey people from Tampere
Tappara players
Utica Devils players